Mégrine (مقرين) is a town and commune in the Ben Arous Governorate, Tunisia.

It has the head office of Monoprix Tunisia.

See also

List of cities in Tunisia

References

External links
  Municipality of Mégrine

Populated places in Ben Arous Governorate
Communes of Tunisia
Tunisia geography articles needing translation from French Wikipedia